Miguel González or Miguel Gonzalez may refer to:
Miguel González (basketball) (1938–2022), Spanish basketball player
Miguel González (Mexican boxer) (born 1967), Mexican  boxer
Miguel González (Paraguayan boxer) (born 1969), Paraguayan boxer
Miguel González (pitcher) (born 1984), Mexican baseball pitcher
Miguel Gonzalez (soccer) (born 1987), American soccer midfielder
Miguel González (catcher) (born 1990), Venezuelan baseball catcher
Miguel González (footballer, born 1927), Spanish footballer
Miguel González (footballer, born 1990), Mexican-American soccer forward
Miguel Alfredo González (1983–2017), Cuban baseball pitcher
Miguel González Avelar (1937–2011), Mexican politician

See also
Miguel Ángel González (disambiguation)
Mike Gonzalez (disambiguation)
Miguel Gonçalves, village east of Sao Filipe on the island of Fogo, Cape Verde